Sylvester Robert Nguni (born 4 May 1955) was the Zimbabwean Minister of State in the office of Vice-President Joyce Mujuru. A member of ZANU–PF, he was the Member of House of Assembly for Mhondoro–Mubaira. He was placed on the United States sanctions list from 2005 until 2016.

References

Members of the National Assembly of Zimbabwe
Living people
1955 births
Government ministers of Zimbabwe
21st-century Zimbabwean politicians
ZANU–PF politicians